The Leica M (Typ 240) is a full-frame digital rangefinder camera of Leica Camera AG. It was introduced in September 2012, and is the successor to the Leica M9 range of cameras. The M uses a 24-megapixel image sensor. The camera is the first M model to feature movie recording, and the first to have Live View, which allows the scene, as viewed through the lens, to be composed. The M can use most M- and R-mount lenses. Leica M cameras are made by hand in Portugal and Germany. There is also a version, the M Monochrom, with a monochrome, rather than colour, sensor.

The M Typ 240 has been superseded by variants such as the Leica M10.

Features
The M uses a CMOS 24-megapixel (6,000 × 4,000 pixels) image sensor designed for Leica by the Belgian company CMOSIS, and made by STMicroelectronics in Grenoble. The pixels are on a 6 x 6 µm² grid.

The M supports most M-mount lenses and, with an adapter, almost all R-mount lenses. R-lenses support an optional electronic viewfinder.

The camera uses a MAESTRO image/video processor which is based on the Fujitsu Milbeaut. It is sealed against dust and water spray.

Reception
The Leica M camera was introduced at the photokina event in Cologne, Germany on 17 September 2012. The launch event included a "concert by recording artist—and Leica shooter—Seal".

In 2019, with the release of a new firmware update the Leica M (Typ 240) was discontinued.

Leica M-P (Typ 240)
The Leica M-P (Typ 240) was announced on 21 August 2014 under the slogan the 'Perfect understatement', the camera was released by Leica two years following the Leica M (Typ 240). Featuring a full-frame 24MP CMOS sensor and 2GB of built-in RAM, Leica claims that the new M-P digital is 'twice as fast' as the standard M (Typ 240). It also features weather-sealing for protection against water and dust, its rear LCD is covered in sapphire crystal glass. The camera was released with the initial price of $7950, a $1000 more than the standard M (Typ 240).

The design of the Leica M-P was based on that of the 35 mm film Leica MP released in 2003. It harks back to the 1950s and the first M mount camera; the Leica M3. The M-P omits the Leica red dot and replaces it with a minimal Leica script logo on the top plate.

Gallery

References

External links

 La Vida Leica - Leica M System Information, reviews and articles 
 Leica M 240 Review 

Digital rangefinder cameras
M
Cameras introduced in 2012